Salima may refer to:

People 
 Salima Aga Khan (born 1940), ex-wife of Prince Karim Aga Khan
 Salima Ghezali (born 1958), an Algerian journalist and writer
 Salima Hamouche (born 1984), an Algerian volleyball player
 Salima Hashmi, a Pakistani artist and writer
 Salima Ikram (born 1965), a Pakistani archaeologist
 Salima Machamba (1874–1964), a sultan of Mohéli
 Salima Murad (c. 1905–1974), an Iraqi Jewish singer 
 Salima Rockwell (born 1974), American volleyball player, coach and broadcaster
Salima Salih (born 1942), short story writer, translator and artist 
 Salima Souakri (born 1974), an Algerian judoka
 Salima Yenbou (born 1971) French politician
 Salima, a fictional character in Team Psykick

Other 
 Salima, Malawi, a town in Malawi 
 Salima District, a district in Malawi

See also 
 Salimah
 Selima (disambiguation)